Paul Sparrow (born 24 March 1975 in Wandsworth, Greater London) is an English, retired professional footballer who played in the Football League for Crystal Palace, Preston North End and Rochdale, as a defender. He also played non-league football for Lancaster City, Stalybridge Celtic, Kendal Town and Chorley.

Playing career
Sparrow began his youth career at Crystal Palace and subsequently signed professional terms. He made his professional debut on 8 November 1995 as a substitute in an away 0–2 defeat to Middlesbrough in a League Cup replay. After one further appearance in the Football League, Sparrow moved to Preston North End, in March 1996. At Preston, Sparrow made 20 league appearances over the next two seasons, without scoring, before moving to Rochdale in 1998. At Rochdale, he made 25 appearances, scoring twice, before moving to Lancaster City in 1999. He spent six seasons at Lancaster and, when he left in 2005, was the club's longest serving player at the time.

Later career
After retiring from football, Sparrow completed the London Marathon. , he was known to be working with the coaching team at Myerscough College.

References

External links

Paul Sparrow at Soccerbase
Paul Sparrow at holmesdale.net

1975 births
Living people
Footballers from Wandsworth
Crystal Palace F.C. players
Preston North End F.C. players
Rochdale A.F.C. players
Lancaster City F.C. players
Stalybridge Celtic F.C. players
Kendal Town F.C. players
Chorley F.C. players
English footballers
Association football defenders
English Football League players